Wickliffe Raper Miller (January 6, 1932May 9, 1994) was an American linguist most well known for his work on Keresan languages and Uto-Aztecan, especially Shoshoni and Guarijio. He worked both on synchronic description and historical linguistics.

His extensive unpublished field notes on Shoshoni are now being used for a language revitalization program.

Publications

References

1932 births
1994 deaths
20th-century linguists
Linguists from the United States
Linguists of Keresan languages
Linguists of Uto-Aztecan languages
People from New Mexico
University of California, Berkeley alumni
University of New Mexico alumni
University of Utah faculty